Malye Bazy is a rural locality (a settlement) in Olkhovatskoye Urban Settlement, Olkhovatsky District, Voronezh Oblast, Russia. The population was 1,660 as of 2010. There are 17 streets.

Geography 
Malye Bazy is located 5 km south of Olkhovatka (the district's administrative centre) by road. Bolshiye Bazy is the nearest rural locality.

References 

Rural localities in Olkhovatsky District